Hołuczków  (Holuchkiv) is a village in the administrative district of Gmina Tyrawa Wołoska, within Sanok County, Subcarpathian Voivodeship, in south-eastern Poland.

The village has a population of 210.

References

Villages in Sanok County